Felidae is a family of mammals in the order Carnivora, colloquially referred to as cats. A member of this family is called a felid. The term "cat" refers both to felids in general and specifically to domestic cats. The characteristic features of cats have evolved to support a carnivorous lifestyle, with adaptations for ambush or stalking and short pursuit hunting. They have slender muscular bodies, strong flexible forelimbs and retractable claws for holding prey, dental and cranial adaptations for a strong bite, and often have characteristic striped or spotted coat patterns for camouflage.

Felidae comprises two extant subfamilies, the Pantherinae and the Felinae. The former includes the five Panthera species tiger, lion, jaguar, leopard, and snow leopard, as well as the two Neofelis species clouded leopard and Sunda clouded leopard. The subfamily Felinae includes 12 genera and 34 species, such as the bobcat, caracal, cheetah, cougar, ocelot, and common domestic cat.

Traditionally, five subfamilies have been distinguished within the Felidae based on phenotypical features: the Felinae, the Pantherinae, the Acinonychinae (cheetahs), the extinct Machairodontinae, and the extinct Proailurinae. Molecular phylogenetic analysis suggests that living (extant) felids fall into eight lineages (clades). The placement of the cheetah within the Puma lineage invalidates the traditional subfamily Acinonychinae, and recent sources use only two subfamilies for extant genera. The number of accepted species in Felidae has been around 40 since the 18th century, though research, especially modern molecular phylogenetic analysis, has over time adjusted the generally accepted genera as well as the divisions between recognized subspecies, species, and population groups. In addition to the extant species listed here, over 30 fossil genera have been described; these are divided into the subfamilies Felinae, Pantherinae, Proailurinae, and Machairodontinae. This final subfamily includes the genus Smilodon, known as the saber-toothed tiger, which went extinct around 10,000 years ago. The earliest known felid genus is Proailurus, part of Proailurinae, which lived approximately 25 million years ago in Eurasia.

Conventions

Conservation status codes listed follow the International Union for Conservation of Nature (IUCN) Red List of Threatened Species. Range maps are provided wherever possible; if a range map is not available, a description of the cat's range is provided. Ranges are based on the IUCN Red List for that species unless otherwise noted. All extinct species or subspecies listed went extinct after 1500 CE, and are indicated by a dagger symbol "".

Classification
The family Felidae consists of 41 extant species belonging to 14 genera and divided into 92 subspecies. This does not include hybrid species (such as the liger) or extinct prehistoric species (such as Smilodon). Modern molecular studies indicate that the 14 genera can be grouped into 8 lineages.

Subfamily Felinae: small and medium-sized cats
Bay cat lineage
Genus Catopuma: two species
Genus Pardofelis: one species
Caracal lineage
Genus Caracal: two species
Genus Leptailurus: one species
Ocelot lineage
Genus Leopardus: eight species
Lynx lineage
Genus Lynx: four species
Puma lineage
Genus Acinonyx: one species
Genus Herpailurus: one species
Genus Puma: one species
Leopard Cat lineage
Genus Otocolobus: one species
Genus Prionailurus: five species
Domestic Cat lineage
Genus Felis: seven species

Subfamily Pantherinae: large cats
Panthera lineage
Genus Neofelis: two species
Genus Panthera: five species

Felids
The following classification is based on the most recent proposals, as codified in 2017 by the Cat Specialist Group of the IUCN. Range maps are based on IUCN range data.

Subfamily Felinae

Bay cat lineage

Caracal lineage

Ocelot lineage

Lynx lineage

Puma lineage

Leopard cat lineage

Domestic cat lineage

Subfamily Pantherinae

Panthera lineage

Notes

References

 
felids
felids